Gulf Aviation was a Bahrain-based charter and scheduled airline that evolved into Gulf Air. Its formal incorporation in 1950 was followed by constant change as the Persian Gulf economies developed.  The airline operation became a subsidiary company branded as Gulf Air on 1 January 1974.

History
Gulf Aviation Company was established in Bahrain in 1949.  The founder was a former RAF pilot, Freddie Bosworth.  Bosworth's original business plan was based on establishing scheduled feeder and cabotage services between some of the Arab States of the Persian Gulf, alongside charter/air taxi services, aircraft handling services and flying training services.  Scheduled operations based in Bahrain commenced on 5 July 1950 to Doha (Qatar) and Sharjah (Trucial States, latterly UAE) and on 28 September 1950 to Dhahran (Saudi Arabia).
The original fleet comprised several Ansons  and, briefly, a de Havilland DH.86B Express.  The de Havilland Dove was selected to replace these, but Bosworth was killed on a demonstration flight at Croydon on 9 June 1951 whilst preparing to introduce the type into service.

During the course of the 1950s de Havilland DH.114 Heron and Douglas C-47/Dakota aircraft joined the fleet.

In 1967 the airline introduced Fokker F27 aircraft and so was able to operate current generation scheduled services with pressurised, air conditioned aircraft and cabin service.  The Heron aircraft were replaced with Beechcraft B80 Queen Airs.

Ownership and subsidiary companies 
Gulf Aviation was established as a limited company on 24 March 1950.  Following the death of Bosworth in 1951, BOAC took a shareholding through its subsidiary BOAC Associated Companies.

Subsidiary companies 
Gulf Helicopters was established in February 1973.  Gulf Aviation held 74% of the shares with British Airways Helicopters holding the remaining 26%.

Aircraft operated

Accidents and incidents
On 19 February 1958, a Gulf Aviation de Havilland Heron (registered G-APJS) crashed into a hill in Italy during bad weather conditions. The aircraft had been on a ferry flight from Athens to Rome with three crew members on board, all of which were killed.
On 10 July 1960, the thirteen passengers and three crew on board a Gulf Aviation Douglas C-47 (registered VT-DGS) died when the aircraft was lost during a flight from Doha to Sharjah. As the wreckage could not be located, the cause for this worst accident in the history of the airline could not be determined. 
On 17 August 1966, a Gulf Aviation C-47 (registered G-AOFZ) crashed after take-off from Muscat/Azaiba aerodrome due to an operating error. The aircraft was unable to climb or maintain altitude after take off due to lack of engine power on the port engine, and crashed 560 yds from the end of the departure runway (rwy 06.) All 20 people on board (18 passengers and two crew) survived the accident.

Notes

References

External links 

Defunct airlines of Bahrain
Airlines established in 1950
Airlines disestablished in 1974
1974 disestablishments in Bahrain